The 1937 Nobel Prize in Literature was awarded to the French author Roger Martin du Gard "for the artistic power and truth with which he has depicted human conflict as well as some fundamental aspects of contemporary life in his novel-cycle Les Thibault".

Laureate

Roger Martin du Gard was awarded for the then seven-part (a final eight part was later published) novel cycle Les Thibault (1922-1940), that chronicles a family of the bourgeoisie from the turn of the 19th century to World War I. His other work includes the novel Jean Barois (1913) that deals with the conflict between the Roman catholic faith of his childhood and the scientific materialism of his maturity and the impact of the Dreyfus affair on the protagonist, sketches of French country life in Vielle France ("Old France", 1933), a study of the author and his friend André Gide (Notes sur André Gide, 1951), and dramas.

Les Thibault
The multi-volume roman-fleuve Les Thibault influenced the Nobel Committee in awarding Du Gard the 1937 Nobel Prize in Literature. It which follows intricately the fortunes of two brothers, Antoine and Jacques Thibault, from their upbringing in a prosperous Catholic bourgeois family to the end of the First World War. The novel was admired by authors like André Gide, Albert Camus, Clifton Fadiman, Georg Lukacs and  Mary McCarthy who called it "a work whose learned obtuseness is, so far as I know, unequaled in fiction."

Deliberations

Nominations
Roger Martin du Gard had been nominated for the prize five times since 1934. In 1937 the Nobel committee received 62 nominations for 37 individuals including Frans Emil Sillanpää (awarded in 1939), Paul Valéry, Paul Claudel, Kostis Palamas, António Correia de Oliveira, Bertel Gripenberg, Karel Capek and Georges Duhamel. Fourteen  were newly nominated such as Stijn Streuvels, Jean Giono, Johan Falkberget, Valdemar Rørdam and Albert Verwey. Most nominations were submitted for the Danish author Johannes V. Jensen (awarded in 1944) with seven nominations. There were seven female nominees namely Maria Madalena de Martel Patrício, Ricarda Huch, Ivana Brlić-Mažuranić, Maila Talvio, Maria Jotuni, Cecile Tormay and Sally Salminen.

The authors Lou Andreas-Salomé, J. M. Barrie, Ellis Parker Butler, Aleksey Chapygin, Ralph Connor, Francis de Croisset, Alberto de Oliveira, John Drinkwater, Florence Dugdale, Edward Garnett, Antonio Gramsci, Frances Nimmo Greene, Ivor Gurney, Elizabeth Haldane, Élie Halévy, W. F. Harvey, Ilya Ilf, Attila József, H. P. Lovecraft, Don Marquis, H. C. McNeile, Dashdorjiin Natsagdorj, Rudolf Otto, Mittie Frances Point (known as Mrs. Alex. McVeigh Miller), Horacio Quiroga, Jean-Joseph Rabearivelo and Yevgeny Zamyatin died in 1937 without having been nominated for the prize. The Dutch poet Albert Verwey died before the only chance to be rewarded.

Notes

References

External links
Award ceremony speech by Per Hallström
Banquet speech by Roger Martin du Gard

Nobel Prize in Literature by year